Franz Bernreiter (born 13 February 1954) is a German former biathlete.

His best individual finish in the Biathlon World Cup was his only podium finish, a third place in the 1980–81 20 km individual in Hedenäset. In the same season, he also finished second as a part of the West German relay team at the World Championships in Lahti. He won bronze in the 1980 Winter Olympics once again as a bart of the West German relay team.

Bernreiter retired as an athlete after the 1983–84 season and the German Championships that year. After his retirement, he worked as a coach first in the West German team and later in the unified German team. He resigned from his coaching position after the 2009–10 season.

References

1954 births
Living people
German male biathletes
People from Regen (district)
Sportspeople from Lower Bavaria
Biathletes at the 1980 Winter Olympics
Olympic biathletes of West Germany
Olympic medalists in biathlon
Olympic bronze medalists for West Germany
Biathlon World Championships medalists
Medalists at the 1980 Winter Olympics